André Andrade de Castro (born 2 November 1991), known as André Castro, is a Brazilian footballer who plays for Lemense. A versatile player, he plays mainly as either a centre-back or defensive midfielder, but can also appear as a right-back.

Career
Born in São Paulo, André Castro played in 2016 for Oeste in the Campeonato Brasileiro Série B due to a partnership between Audax and Oeste.

In May 2019, Castro returned to Atlético Goianiense.

Career statistics

References

External links

André Castro at ZeroZero

1991 births
Living people
Brazilian footballers
Brazilian expatriate footballers
Footballers from São Paulo
Association football defenders
Association football midfielders
Association football utility players
Campeonato Brasileiro Série A players
Campeonato Brasileiro Série B players
Campeonato Brasileiro Série C players
Grêmio Osasco Audax Esporte Clube players
Guaratinguetá Futebol players
Esporte Clube Vitória players
Oeste Futebol Clube players
Atlético Clube Goianiense players
Red Bull Brasil players
Associação Atlética Ponte Preta players
Mirassol Futebol Clube players
Ituano FC players
Erbil SC players
Brazilian expatriate sportspeople in Iraq
Expatriate footballers in Iraq